is a Japanese manga series written and illustrated by Yukiya Sakuragi. It started in Shueisha's seinen manga magazine Weekly Young Jump on September 22, 2004, and was later transferred to Monthly Young Jump on August 18, 2009, where it ran until April 28, 2010. Its chapters were collected in 17 tankōbon volumes. The series was licensed in North America by Viz Media with a preview in the new Animerica; Viz Media ceased its publication in March 2011.

Plot
Sheltered and controlled by her parents for most of her life, and owner of a loyal mutt named Lupin, 18-year-old Suguri wants to move from the country-side to the big city, Tokyo, to find a career and a new life. After being kidnapped and stranded at a rest area, Lupin mates another dog while her owner Teppei is not looking, shattering his dream of a litter of purebred puppies. To make up for her mongrel's wayward wooing, Suguri accepts Teppei's offer to work at the pet store he manages which leads her to numerous adventures of canine antics.

Characters

Main

A 18-year-old girl loves everything about the canine world. She is innocent, clumsy, and a bit of an airhead, but she cares deeply for both dogs and humans. Her best friend is her mutt Lupin who Suguri states is like her "alter ego". As a young girl, Suguri was kidnapped, and although the kidnapper was apparently never caught, Suguri herself was found and rescued shortly afterward by Lupin's grandfather, and she wears his red collar around her neck in homage. The incident however caused her parents to be extremely over-protective of her which of course led to her naive and inexperienced view of the world. She was not even allowed to go on school field-trips, and her curfew was at 5:30pm. Her connection with all dogs is so strong that when she first enters the Woofles Pet Shop, every puppy in the store starts to produce "happy pee", a reflexive action whenever puppies get excited. She can even sense when a dog is ready to use the restroom or when a dog is trying to tell her something urgent. Because Teppei keeps her as only part-time, Suguri gets a job as a hostess alongside a friend of hers to earn extra money. She later begins to develop a crush on Teppei and sometimes becomes jealous if another girl gives him too much attention or if she suspects that he is interested in someone, much like dogs make a big fuss over strange dogs who get too close to their owner. She comes from wealthy family, for her parents' house is the size of a mansion. She and Kim have plans to breed Chanta and Lupin together, though Teppei insists that they wait until they are sure the puppies will have a home. In order to get the best possible idea on what kind of puppies Lupin might end up siring, Suguri began researching Lupin's family tree. While she has learned a lot and remains enthusiastic, her search has unfortunately brought to light some of the darker aspects of her own past, as it caused her to discover that a young man who owns/owned a good majority of Lupin's family is actually her kidnapper from all those years ago.

The male lead of Inubaka, Teppei is the manager of a pet shop by the name of "Woofles" and lives in an apartment above the store. When he was a boy, Teppei frequently picked up stray dogs, much to the chagrin of his single mother who was barely able to support the two of them. Despite his aloof and nonchalant nature, Teppei retains his weak spot for both strays be they dogs or people, allowing both Kentaro and Suguri to work at Woofles and even to crash with him until they earn enough to find their own place. Being fluent in all areas of dog knowledge; Teppei is an expert groomer, is well versed in canine diet and health, and can even state the history of nearly every breed from memory. Unfortunately, Teppei lacks any sort of practical business sense; occasionally expanding services at Woofles without knowing if the profits can cover the costs and believing that matching dogs to the best owners possible is more important than profit. He owns a purebred black Lab named Noa. He allows Suguri to temporarily work at Woofles to make up for her dog Lupin's tryst with Noa and later hires her as a permanent employee after seeing her repertoire with dogs, although her naive nature occasionally annoys him into punishing her in slapstick fashion. Teppei sometimes displays a slightly negative bias against "mutts", especially the breeding of them, despite the fact he sees the good points in owning a dog of mixed ancestry and believes that all dogs are deserving of good homes. This is partly due to the fact he worries about possible unknown genetic diseases, but mostly because absolutely hates seeing mistreated and abandoned animals and knows that many of the animals subjected to that sort of treatment are of unknown blood; his logic is that the less mixed breed puppies are born, the less puppies have to deal with the risk of being unwanted. He does not seem to have a problem with selling mixed-breed pups if he is certain they will have a home, however, as shown when he brought in a half-Dachshund, half-Chihuahua puppy after it was requested by a client.

A girl licensed in dog grooming, Momoko was hired by Teppei to assist with the increased number of clients for Woofles pet boutique services. As a young girl, Momoko was ostracized by her classmates due to a weight problem except for a boy named Yuu. Momoko's relationship with Yuu inspired her to lose weight in a healthy, balanced way and the two eventually became a couple. Unfortunately, Yuu's true self was manipulative and controlling; frequently sponging money off of her even as he dated other girls behind her back. The resulting strain from Yuu's abuse caused Momoko to become cold and withdrawn to the world around her except when she is grooming dogs. With the help and support of Suguri, Momoko found the strength to break up with Yuu and she and her Toy Poodle Mel move in with Suguri into the "Woofles Girls Dorm", which is an apartment leased by Teppei above the store. She is still fairly shy around people.

A high school friend of Teppei, Kentaro is an amateur musician who performs guitar on the street. Teppei hired Kentaro to work at Woofles after seeing he had no home or job and also allows him to sleep in the doghouse in the kennels atop the store roof. Although at first he did not like dogs, Kentaro came to tolerate them and even became friends with Lupin, sharing his beer with him and composing songs about him. Kentaro is addicted to pachinko gambling to the point that he once stole money from Suguri to feed his addiction and subsequently lost all of it. He has a crush on Kanako-sensei but continually fails to attract her attention. It's also revealed in Volume 4 of the Manga that he has a younger sister named Mika. She's a junior high school student and a dog lover. His hair is dyed blond.

Recurring
Kanako Mori (Kanako Sensei)
A regular customer at Woofles's, Kanako teaches piano and lives in the same building as the Woofles's staff. She owned a Pomeranian by the name of Czerny, of whom she treated like a daughter and was protective of to the point of paranoia, shooing away Lupin whenever he got too close. She claimed that her dog talks to her, as seen when a puppy from Woofles wandered into her apartment. She even claimed that when her dog was knocked out, she came to see her to warn her that there was a fire in the hotel she was staying at in Austria. She gave her dog fresh human food to eat, along with aromatherapy, grooming every Friday, a whole wardrobe of clothes, a miniature piano that could be played claiming she was a little pianist, and even birthday parties once every year. When suddenly Czerny dies, she went could not accept the fact that her beloved dog had died, and went into denial, looking for every factor that could have contributed to her death, even to the point of blaming herself, and for a second Lupin. When she brought Czerny's corpse home, she cried so hard that she fainted on the floor, only to be woken up by Suguri the following morning. After the corpse was cremated, she eventually started to drink, and temporarily close down her piano school. She would also bring home strange men from Host Clubs to her apartment. Kentaro eventually confronted her and told her that what she was doing was wrong and that Czerny would not have wanted her to be so unhappy. She slowly recovers after looking through albums of Czerny's life. She originally moved to Tokyo to go to a Musical College. After being dumped by her fiance, she wanted to open up a piano school, but had trouble finding students. When she passed by a pet shop, she saw a two-month-old Czerny and adopted her on the spot. During their first walk, Czerny found her a four-leaf clover, out of countless regular ones. She adopted a piebald Dachshund after seeing Czerny's spirit touch the dog and saying she should adopt him.

Another customer of Woofles. When she comes into the store, she comes across as very smug, spoiled, and antisocial. When she sees a chihuahua, she expresses a desire for one, and melts when she holds the long-coated variety puppy at Woofles. She came in with her senior golden retriever named Ricky, and jokingly said, "When Ricky dies, I wanna get a Chihuahua!" much to the irritation of Suguri. Ricky died of old age after he alerted Suguri the very same chihuahua she wanted had a potentially fatal heart condition. In return for Ricky’s love, Chizuru adopted the chihuahua, named him Melon, and vowed she would care for it until it was time for his life to pass away as well. At certain points Chizuru would spoil Melon so much that it became a big problem but it was soon solved. She becomes close friends with Suguri. After she adopts Melon, she takes a hostess job help pay for Melon's medical bills. She's a bit of a bully, for she usually makes fun of the way Akiba and Zidane look, and harassed him when he asked her for her help in the production of a video about Zidane.

A young otaku who Suguri introduced to the unconditional love dogs have for people, something he had never known from his classmates who ostracize him as a loser and nerd. He purchases a French bulldog whom he names "Zidane" and turns into a true "dog otaku" who incessantly talks to those around him about the history of any dog breed he encounters. The character biography page in the front of each manga volume states that he's a government employee. He had a crush on Chizuru, however this crush quickly ended because of her disrespect for him. He's put Zidane on a strict diet because of his dramatic weight gain. He now does a "Doga" class, which is Yoga you can do with your dog. It's discovered in Volume 10 of the manga that he lives with his parents. Oddly, his parents are part of the reason for why Zidane has gained so much weight. He has a dream of taking Zidane with him to Paris, France. He plans on making Zidane a Show-Dog. His last name is a reference to the type of otaku who frequent Akihabara.

A super model for a woman’s magazine. Nicknamed "Yamarin" by her fans and peers. Yamarin performed in a commercial that also starred a papillon (dog) from Show's store who later had to be replaced with its sibling from Teppei's store when its ears drooped undesirably. She once owned a cocker spaniel who died a few days before the commercial and Yamarin became greatly depressed to the point that she could not focus on her work. However, after seeing Suguri's dedication to taking care of the papillon used in the commercial, Yamarin pulls herself together and later purchases the papillon for herself and names it "Lucky". They both have a very close bond because in one of the volumes she was in trouble and Lucky came to her rescue. Also when she had to choose which magazine she would do a bikini shoot for, she chose the one Lucky put his paw on. Although, Lucky wants all her attention to himself. She gave Kannako advice about how to cope with her grief after Czerny died.
Bae Yong Kim
A Korean friend of Kentaro, he plays the harmonica and is an exchange student from South Korea. Kim had a strong fear of dogs because in Korea, dogs were often used for eating purposes, which caused strays to act very aggressive to anybody who would try to touch them. Kim himself relates of how one encounter with a stray left him with a nasty scar on his bottom. He develops a crush on Suguri and becomes determined to be close to her by becoming closer to dogs. To that end, Kim adopts a Shiba Inu puppy he names "Chanta". Despite the difficulty in raising her caused by his general inexperience with dogs (including one incident where Chanta nearly died from electrocution after biting a power cord), he soon becomes a dedicated and loving owner. However, he loves Chanta so much that he has a hard time training her properly because he cannot be strict with her. Thanks to Chanta, he's become popular with all the female pet owners in his classes. He made a photo book of Chanta when she turned a year old. Oddly, Suguri was also in every page of the book with Chanta! His name is alludes to Korean soap opera celebrity Bae Yong-joon.

Teppei's direct superior, Show owns the Woofles chain and also manages the main store. Unlike Teppei, Show is ruthlessly pragmatic and is more concerned with the business aspects of running a pet shop, viewing sales and profit as more important than matching dogs to the best potential owner. Despite his seemingly Machiavellian nature, Show genuinely loves dogs; being able to trigger nearby puppies to produce "happy pee" with his presence like Suguri can and condemning a rival trainer for forcing his dog to compete in agility competition despite being injured. Show also enjoys needling Teppei by calling him little brother. He owns a pedigree afghan hound named Alfred. He notices Suguri's connection to dogs after she manages to get Alfred to shake paws with her, something only Show himself should be able to do, whereupon he labels her as "interesting". He's extremely nervous about the new "Wan Kan" pet shop that moved across the street from Woofles. Whenever he comes in he normally brings in a large dog, such as a Standard Poodle or Borzoi. He helped coach Suguri for the Dog Dancing Competition.
Hibino
The manager of the "Wan Kaw" pet shop who owns a miniature pinscher puppy named Sabrina. He's visited the Woofles pet shop twice to see how the shop was being run. He concluded that the shop had a decent smell, friendly workers, and reasonably priced items for sale. After his visits, he decided to make his shop bigger and more lavish than Woofles. He has a high budget for his shop that allows him to supply it with various appliances for a dog's benefit. His shop includes a dog bakery, hotel, salon, boutique, cages for the puppies that are three times as large as the cages at Woofles, and security cameras, and he's even laid out a grass lawn on the rooftop of his shop where customers can play with their dogs in a good old-fashioned environment. He is not an antagonist, despite his occasionally dark aura. He comes from a family of dog lovers, and he has also owned eight dogs at one time before he adopted Sabrina. During his second visit to Woofles, he adopted a Papillon puppy to see if a spreading rumour that puppies at Woofles were already potty-trained was true. He ends up keeping his dog in a loving environment. Like Teppei, he has a dream of helping stray dogs find homes and giving them a second chance, unfortunately due to his competitive nature he sometimes finds himself thinking more about the quality of his store's services rather than the well-being of the dogs he sells. He does mean well however and will put more thought into his ideas if he realizes they may contradict his ideals. In keeping with his dream, he also has a large vacant room in the back of his store that he plans on one day using as a shelter for older dogs in need of homes.

A 21-year-old spy for Hibino. He works at Woofles in order to obtain all the store's information. He uses a USB flashdrive to obtain all of Teppei's store and breeder information and gives it to Hibino. While working at Woofles, he agrees with Teppei's idea that dogs are not things and are living creatures that need humans to be happy. He's one of Hibino's favorite employees. For a young kid, he smokes and goes to Chizuru's Hostess Club for drinks. He and Hibino were in business with another pet shop who treated dogs like things. Therefore, they both set out to make a shop where dogs and strays could be given a second chance to get a new home. He decides to move back to his home town in Volume 11 of the manga. Before he leaves he adopts a Beagle puppy from Woofles to take home to his parents and mixed breed dog. His new dream is to become a Veterinarian.

A beautiful, but naive break-dancer who owns an English Pointer named Carlos. She was hired by Hibino's assistant after she saw her perform at a Train Station. She dances with Carlos, who is able to catch anything she throws in the air during a dance, which adds flare to her final move. Hibino's main intention is to increase Wan Kaw's popularity by having her win a Dog Dancing contest. On her way to Wan Kaw, she steps into Woofles by mistake and meets Teppei. They have an enjoyable conversation, but she walks out embarrassed when she finds out she went to the wrong store. She's a foreigner, and even though she can speak Japanese fluently, she cannot read or write in it. When she signs a contract with Hibino, she signs her name in Latin script. She's from Brazil, and moved to Japan to become a lady, as stated in Volume 12.
Fujita
He's a wealthy individual from an influential family, and lives in an extravagant house with his parents. He's the owner of Nishiki, Lupin's father, as well as Amuro, who was one of Lupin's litter mates. His family also owned the German Shepherd that mothered Nishiki. He is approached by Suguri when she learns he owns some of Lupin's relatives. While polite and complying to Suguri and her questions regarding Lupin's ancestry, he has a somewhat odd personality and ominous disposition. It is eventually revealed to Suguri by her father that he is the one who kidnapped Suguri when she was four years old, but he was never turned in as a result of a deal between their families; the Fujitas would help the Miyauchis during their financial crisis and in return no charges would be pressed against them. Fujita met Suguri when he was a teenager, seeing her crying over an injured stray dog that ironically became the dog that saved her from him. He apparently found her innocence "adorable", which triggered his kidnapping of her. Though he distanced himself from her after the incident, he has harboured a rather disturbing obsession with her ever since, and proudly outright admits to being a stalker. He however still denies having any real fetishes or ever even having sexual thoughts towards Suguri, and makes claims that he cares for her well being and that he would not hurt her, despite the fact that he'd tied her up and left her in a trunk when he kidnapped her (which he asserts that he now knows was "wrong" on his part). While some of his advances toward her have a more "romantic" feel, he seems to view her more like how one would a "pet". In spite of learning his history, Suguri still, albeit more hesitantly continued to contact him in an effort to learn more about what happened back then and about Lupin's history. Unfortunately for her, Fujita's obsession escalates after she saves his beloved dog Amuro after Amuro gets badly injured by a motorcycle. Touched and enamoured by Suguri's show of kindness, he begins to dub himself as Suguri's "servant" and more openly contact Suguri; visiting her frequently at Woofles, sending her text messages, and attempting to give her lavish gifts, all the while still continuing his previous stalker behaviour, much to Suguri's chagrin.

Minor

Mika is Kentaro's younger sister. She is described as smart and from a prestigious family. Mika loves dogs and comes to the pet shop everyday. Though she seems to have a great life, she deals with strict parents and is often alone. She used to be her school's soccer team's manager but quit and apparently had no friends. She'd started to cut after seeing it on a website and at one point tried to kill herself because she felt too much pressure to be a model student from others and hated who she was. After being kidnapped by thugs, Lupin saves her life and Mika stops cutting after being lectured by Teppei. She has stated that if Lupin ever sired pups, she'd like to take one in.

Leo is a professional dog trainer hired by Teppei. He holds training classes on the pet shop's roofs and helps train Lupin, Melon, Chanta, Zidane, and other local dogs.
Minoru
Minoru is an assistant to Nakatani, a dog breeder who provides Teppei with some of the puppies sold at Woofles. He is often mean and unsociable but is very knowledgeable about dogs. He helps Suguri learn more about dog breeding, when she stays with him and the Nakatani in the mountains. He bears the scars of growing up in a troubled home, his father being an abusive alcoholic and his mother having abandoned him when he was in middle school. After being stabbed by his father, he was taken in by family. His only companion was a dog he had since he was a baby. After getting out of juvenile detention, he and his dog were taken by in by Nakatani. Minoru also is an artist by heart and has made numerous sketches and paintings of dogs. He warms up to Suguri and appears to have developed some form of affection towards her. Suguri keeps in touch with him after she returns home.
Teppei's Mom
Making her first appearance at the end of volume 8, she stops by Woofles to check on her son. She originally came to scold him about not remembering her birthday, as she knows her son is busy, but requested he just wished her a happy birthday each year. She also came to buy a puppy from Woofles. Teppei asks her why she's suddenly decided to have a dog,( because she never let him keep any of the stray dogs he brought as a child). She explains to both him and Suguri that she wanted to keep them, but she was just divorced and they could barely afford to eat back then. She looks at a Miniature Pinscher, a Toy Poodle, a Cavalier King Charles Spaniel, and Pug. When she sees a larger American Cocker Spaniel it looks at her with pleading eyes. She asks why he's bigger than the other puppies, and he explains that the puppy is older and if he could not find him a home by the end of the week, he would have to return him to the breeder. Looking at the dog reminded her of a stray Teppei brought as a child, they had the same sad eyes. She adopts the Cocker Spaniel right on the spot and takes him home saying, "I love his beautiful coat". Ironically, she's a hair stylist for humans!

Dogs
Lupin
A mixed-breed dog who belongs to Suguri. His grandfather (whose collar Suguri wears around her neck) saved Suguri when she was kidnapped as a child. Suguri considers Lupin to be her alter ego and is unable to function without him near her. He has the ability to unlock his kennel door and a habit of coming down into the shop when it's crowded, much to Teppei's annoyance. Suguri named him after the anime character Lupin III since like his namesake, Lupin seems to have an attraction for females, be they dog or human. He sometimes (and only sometimes) is able to understand commands that he's been never taught, being able to tell if a person is trustworthy or not, and humorously almost always rolling over in submission to any dogs that seem powerful or dominant, whether they truly be aggressive or not. Lupin is of mixed breeds, however he seems to be mostly, if not completely, made up of dog breeds from the Spitz family. Ryusuke even thought he was a Kishu Inu when he first met him. Suguri and Kim hope to breed him with Chanta, going by the logic that since she's a pure Shiba Inu, and Lupin is a mix of other native Japanese dog breeds, they will have a good general idea of what the puppies will look like. In volume 15 of the manga, parts of Lupin's bloodline were revealed. His grandfather Lupin was a mix, and his grandmother was a pedigree German Shepherd. So, Lupin's father is 50% German Shepherd and 50% Mutt. Lupin's mother is a Kishu Inu mix and her mother is thought to be a pure breed Kishu with no health problems. Therefore, Lupin is 25% German Shepherd, 37.5% Kishu Inu, and 37.5% mix of other native Japanese breeds.
Noa
A Labrador Retriever dog who belongs to Teppei. She was at one time supposed to breed with a champion, until Lupin accidentally slipped away from Suguri and mated with her. Much to Teppei's relief, a pregnancy was avoided but he refused to allow Lupin to get so much as near her again. Noa was purchased by Teppei when he was still in schooling. She is well-behaved and also has a strong maternal instinct, as shown when she adopted a stray kitten as her own. She even protected the kitten when a strange cat tried to get at it, though it was never made known if the cat was actually its mother or not. She still gets along with Lupin, and is extremely social with humans. Her name comes from the French word for black, "noir". Her name is listed as "Cappuccino" on her pedigree papers. In Volume 14, she finally had puppies with a Golden lab named John. She accepted him quietly, and she had seven puppies. Two were black like her, and five were Golden like their father. Teppei expressed desire to keep one of the black puppies, as it reminded him of Noa, but had to give it up when it was requested 'that the puppy be trained to be a service dog, even though John's owner already took one of Noa's yellow puppies.
Czerny
A Pomeranian belonging to Kanako-sensei. She shares a telepathic connection to her owner, which allows Czerny to contact Kanako during her work assignment in Europe and alert her to a fire that had begun in the adjoining hotel room. She's a very spoiled dog. She tends to bounce in the air to get something she wants. In Volume 3 of the manga, she jumps up to catch a tennis ball before Noa or Lupin can, jumps onto one of Kanako-sensei's piano students, and to jump and lick Kentaro's face. She also jumps up to kick Lupin in the head after waking up from running into a fence. It's shown that Czerny is an athletic dog with her own team. Later, Kanako-sensei discovered she had kidney stone, which caused Czerny to die. Czerny's spirit appeared before Kanako when she was with Sonata, and nodded her head to Kanako's question of if she approved of adopting a homeless dog. After the Sun sets that day, her soul ascends to heaven for good, and she leaves with a smile on her face.
Ricky
A senior Golden Retriever belonging to Chizuru that died of old age in volume 1. He alerted to Suguri that Melon had a heart condition and in gratitude for Ricky's love, Chizuru adopted Melon as her own. His picture is worn on a collar around Melon's neck. Before he dies, he has a flashback of himself and Chizuru playing fetch when they very young.
Melon
A long-coated chihuahua owned by Chizuru. He had a heart condition which potentially limited his life. Since Teppei could not legally sell any dog with a serious health condition, he instead gives Melon to Chizuru free of charge. He underwent surgery to fix his heart condition, which was a complete success. He's a mischievous dog who will do anything for Chizuru's attention. In volume 4 of the manga he even attacked an expensive purse she had bought because she was giving it a lot attention. In the same volume, he "mounts" Chanta in hopes to get everyone's attention during a training session. He's eventually trained to respect and obey Chizuru as his master. He's best friends with Zidane. He was fixed in Volume 16 after he urinated on a new DVD player. Despite being fixed, he still marks his territory, and still has dominant behaviors, all of which are a side effect of being neutered after maturity. He no longer goes after female dogs in heat, however.
Zidane
A French bulldog purchased by Akiba. Because French bulldogs are so rare, Akiba had a chip implanted in Zidane in the event that he was ever stolen. The chip was put to use when Suguri and the others tracked down a pet store owner who sold stolen dogs; they used Zidane to catch him in the act. He's a very friendly dog, he will even go up to a complete stranger if the person will offer him food. He's started gaining because Akiba's parents kept on feeding him human food. He's a very obedient dog that listens to Akiba's every command. He shares an extremely close bond with Melon. His bone structure, facial structure, and temperament are all in check with the Japan Kennel Club. Akiba plans on making Zidane a show dog. Zidane dies in volume 22.
Rosetta
Part of a litter of Papillon puppies whom Show split up to be sold between his and Teppei's stores. Show took Rosetta, saying he had huge hopes for her to be a show dog. Rosetta stars in a bread commercial with Yamashita. However, after the practice, one of Rosetta's ears droops, revealing that she is a Phalène, or a drop-eared Papillion. She is still owned by Show in a loving environment.
Lucky
Part of a litter of Papillon puppies whom Show split up to be sold between his and Teppei's stores. One of his litter mates was scheduled to shoot a commercial with Yamashita but Lucky replaced it after his sibling's ears began to droop undesirably. With training done on set by both Yamashita and Suguri (who suggested calling the dog Lucky so it would train better) Lucky succeeded in filming the commercial with only moderate difficulty. Afterwards, Show attempted to purchase Lucky with the intent of turning him into an advertising mascot until Yamashita arrived to adopt Lucky for herself. He's every close to his owner. However he wants all her attention to himself.
Chanta
A Shiba Inu that had been purchased at Woofles by an old man who died of old age a mere week later. Having lost her new owner, she was adopted by Kim and named after the tiles she mixed up during a game of mahjong that Kim was playing with Suguri. Chanta has something of a teething problem, chewing up Kim's special guitar pick and a band aid on his face given to Kim by Suguri. Shortly after being taken home, Chanta nearly died from electrocution when she chewed on a power cord. Luckily, Chanta was able to be revived by Kim with some emergency coaching in dog CPR by Teppei over the phone. She's a very diverse dog and she greatly loves Kim. She was humped by Melon in Volume 4 of the manga but did not become pregnant since she was too young to have puppies. Kim has plans to breed her with Lupin, his goal being to see her brightest smile ever.
Alfred
A pedigree Afghan Hound owned by Show. Alfred is characterized by his aloof demeanor and is trained to only obey commands by Show. Lupin finds him rather intimidating and will slink away if Alfred so much as looks at him. Alfred only obeys Show and, oddly, Suguri.
Barbie
A Sheltie owned by the dog trainer, Leo Suzuki. She's used to show Kim, Chizuru, and Akiba how to control their dogs. She obeys Leo on every command he gives her. She only appears in Volume 4 of the Manga.
Henry
Henry is a German Shepherd Dog. He belongs to Kyoko Furuya. He competed in agility competitions, but stopped when he caused his owner to have an accident and was hospitalize for quite some time. Henry would not let anyone touch him or he would start barking frequently. But Surguri started to bond with him and with Suguri's training, Henry was able to slalom again and he took second place at an agility competition. Haruomi Nishina gave a booster to his dog, so he was disqualified, leaving Henry with the default - 1st place.
Grace
Grace is a Papillon that runs agility courses. She belongs to Show and is very skilled. She is the mother of Lucky, Rosetta, and a third puppy.
June
June is a Border Collie, belonging to agility competitor Haruomi Nishina. June is a balanced black and white dog, but Haruomi mentions that he got too fat for the competition.
August
August is a Border Collie, also owned by Haruomi Nishina. August is more black than white, but sadly he cannot do the competition either because, according to Haruomi, he has gotten fat as well.
April
April is a Border Collie, owned by Haruomi Nishina. April is a lighter Border Collie, which is less common. Haruomi states that she reacts too slow, and while Haruomi mentioned her name, a few seconds later April's head bobbed.
May
May is a Border Collie, also owned by Haruomi Nishina. Haruomi says that May is the best athlete and his champion. He says no matter what kind of dogs are there, May will beat them. During practice, Haruomi runs her through a course. The time ends up as 42.55 seconds. Later on, May's leg joint becomes inflamed. She still runs because Haruomi gives her pain killers and even though she gets the best time, Haruomi is knocked off the winners block when it is discovered he made her run while knowing she was injured. May eventually heals up enough to walk normally, but cannot do agility again.
Taro
Taro is a Miniature Schnauzer puppy who is owned by Tsutomu Nakabayashi and his daughter, Risa. Taro barks a lot because of movie scripts hidden in his backyard. Risa was not kind to Taro or her father, but everything changed when Taro dug up the time capsule.
Schneider
A Doberman Pinscher who is king of the Dog Café. Chizuru remarks that the dogs "line up to sniff his butt". He is very reserved and belongs to Akira, the human king of the Dog Café and a café regular.
Mosh
A West Highland White Terrier, owned by Jin. Little is known about Mosh except that he is loved extremely by his owner and obeys Jin. He's older than all the other dogs of the other customers because in Kanako's flashback, Mosh was a full grown dog when Czerny was a puppy.
Cookie
Cookie is a Miniature Dachshund, owned by Mayu-chan and her mother. When Mayu was mourning over the loss of her brother who recently died, she'd stolen the puppy and called the pup by her brother's name - Keita, because she thought that the Dachshund might be her brother reincarnated. Suguri finds the two and takes them back. Later, though, Mayu and her mother adopt the puppy and she names him after her favorite food.
Beckham
A dog that is owned by Kim's landlady. He appears to be a St. Bernard. Kim plays with him to help himself get used to dogs. He's very mellow, but he only appears in Volume 2 of the Manga and in the first chapter of Volume 3.
Lychee
Lychee is a very minor character. He's a purebred Shih Tzu. He comes into Woofles when his fur is overgrown and tangled. He's appeared in Volumes 7 and 10 of the Manga. Momoko gives him a trim with a bob-cut and puts braids behind his ears during his first visit. Saijo spazzes out, but ends up loving the braids.
Mel
Mel is a pedigree Toy Poodle that belongs to Momoko Takeuchi, however it is explained that Mel is considered unsuitable for breeding and showing due to not having a solid-color coat. Momoko once dyed Mel's fur completely black to make her sellable and nearly gave her up to save the life of her horrible ex-boyfriend, Yuu, even though he'd used her. Mel was saved when Suguri changed Momoko's mind. Momoko has pictures of Mel in various different haircuts on her camera. Despite nearly being sold, Mel is still dearly loved. Mel normally wears a jacket or a T-shirt to cover the discolored patches on her body. She pays no attention to Lupin, even though he occasionally tries to mount her. She died in volume 22.
Sabrina
A miniature pinscher that belongs to Hibino. She occasionally yaps when she's near Suguri. She's given expensive car seat, bed, and T-shirt from Hibino for her pleasure. She really loves Hibino, which shows his love for dogs and that he really cares for them.
Anne
A Papillon that was purchased from Woofles by Hibino. Hibino purchased her to see if the rumor about Woofles training their dogs was true. Ironically, she went directly on the pee pad every time. Hibino keeps Anne and takes care of her the exact same way he takes care of Sabrina; with love.
Carlos
An English Pointer who is able to dance with his owner. He can perform multiple tricks while dancing with his owner. During the K-9 freestyle competition, during his dance, he jumped and tried to retrieve a feather hat, that one of the judges was wearing.
Sonata
A piebald Dachshund that was adopted by Kanako after his former owner died in an earthquake. He appears to be about two years old. He moved into Czerny's old room and was, like Czerny, given a music related name. Kanako bought a whole new wardrobe for him after she threw out all of Czerny's old clothes.
Lupao
Lupin's younger brother from their mother's second litter. He is still a small puppy and he and Lupin have different coat types and markings. He wrestles with Lupin, and they sleep together during Suguri's visit back at home. Suguri's mother is thinking of adopting him herself. He resembles a small Shiba Inu puppy with the face and coat color of one. He acts more mature than Lupin, despite being two years younger than he is.
Shiro
A Kishu Inu mix who is Lupin and Lupao's mother. She resembles a pure white Kishu Inu and her mother is thought to a Purebreed one as well since she was born in the exact prefecture of where the breed originated. She's healthy, and has had two litters, the first of which known to have bore Lupin and Amuro. All of her puppies in her previous litter found homes, and she is currently nursing her second litter.
Nishiki
A German Shepherd mix who is Lupin's father, and the son of the original Lupin. He's 14 years old, and due to his old age is very weak and has difficulty standing. His father was the dog that saved Suguri 14 years ago. He is precisely 50% German Shepherd. He actually resembles a Kishu Inu with German Shepherd markings and coloration.
Amuro
Lupin's sister from the same litter as him (also Lupao's older sister). She has the exact same coat coloring as Lupin and would easily be mistaken for him if it were not for her different colored eye. She has heterochromia, with her left eye being lighter in color than her right. She is capable of fetching a wallet, like Lupin, and has been noted to somehow have a more "intelligent", and "mature" air about her than her brother. She lives with her and Lupin's father. She was hit by a motorcycle at the end of vol. 15, and almost died because of her injuries. She had internal bleeding, and both her back legs were broken. Amuro was given emergency resuscitation by Suguri, who later also donated Lupin's blood to help her pull through. Thanks to Suguri's efforts, Amuro survived surgery. She's currently in physical therapy and rehabilitation. Amuro shares her name with a character from the original Mobile Suit Gundam, therefore meaning that she and her brother have been named after classic anime characters.
Lupin I
A mixed stray dog with an enigmatic background. He is Lupin's grandfather, and the dog that saved Suguri when she was kidnapped. He was once just an ordinary stray dog that frequented the town. Suguri met him when she'd been playing hide and seek and found him injured. A teenager passing by heard her cries and helped her administer first aid to the original Lupin. He witnessed her being kidnapped by the teenager, Fujita, and apparently remembering her kindness towards him, alerted some nearby kids that she'd been thrown into the trunk of an old car, thus rescuing her. He was apparently henceforth credited by the townspeople as being a great dog, and a legend.

Manga

North American releases

Reception

Carlo Santos praised the realistically drawn and very cute dogs, but was disappointed by the fanservice in the early chapters, and felt that the story relied on sentimentalism. AE Sparrow for IGN endorsed the first volume, but compared it to Old Yeller in its themes.

References

External links
 Official website 
 Official page at VIZ site
 

Comedy anime and manga
Seinen manga
Shueisha manga
Viz Media manga
Zainichi Korean culture